"Second Chance" is a song by American rock band 38 Special, from their eighth studio album, 1988's Rock & Roll Strategy. Written by keyboardist Max Carl, guitarist Jeff Carlisi and Cal Curtis, the rock ballad was released as the album's second single becoming the band's highest-charting song in the United States. This song, of which Carl was the lead vocalist, showcases a stylistic departure from their signature Southern Rock sound.

Background and composition
"Second Chance" began as a song written by Jeff Carlisi and Cal Curtis in 1983 entitled "I Never Wanted Anyone Else But You," which was only recorded as a demo; according to Carlisi, 38 Special's original frontman Don Barnes did not envision the band to record the song: "[he] didn't feel [it] was really a 38 [Special] song."
When Max Carl replaced Don Barnes in 38 Special in 1988, Carlisi played the demo of "I Never Wanted Anyone Else But You" for Carl who remarked that "the guy in the song sounded like a real jerk"; Carlisi's reply: "yeah, but a lot of people have been through this and want forgiveness" prompting Carl's response: "yeah, maybe the guy needs a second chance" leading to the song's being reworked with the new lyric: "A heart needs a second chance" as its main hook line. Carlisi would state: "I think lyrically what [original lyricist] Cal [Curtis] sketched out was brilliant, but the real thing that touches people is that one simple phrase 'a heart needs a second chance.' No one had said it like that before and that’s what makes a great song...[Carl] really brought it home and had such a marvellous voice. I mean, the guy could sing 'Mary Had a Little Lamb' and you'd go buy it, he was so good. He really sold that song."

Release and reception
"Second Chance" entered the U.S. Billboard Hot 100 singles chart at No.78 in February 1989. 
The song was the highest-charting Hot 100 single of the band's career, as it peaked at No.6 in May 1989 and spent 21 weeks on the chart. The song reached No.5 on the Singles Sales chart and No.9 on the Hot 100 Airplay chart. 
It also peaked at No.2 on the Mainstream Rock chart, and became the band's first No.1 single on the Adult Contemporary chart. 
It was Billboard magazine's "Adult Contemporary Song of the Year" for 1989. The single peaked at No.2 in Canada 
and No.14 in Australia, where it spent 12 weeks on the chart.

Despite "Second Chance"'s affording 38 Special an apparent breakthrough hit, it was not enough to improve the lackluster sales of Rock & Roll Strategy and A&M Records did not renew the band's contract. The group's next album, Bone Against Steel, was released on Charisma Records in 1991.

Although "Second Chance" would remain 38 Special's career record, Carlisi stated in 2009: "To this day when the name 38 Special comes up nobody says 'Second Chance'! It was our biggest hit but people always think of 'Hold On Loosely' or 'Caught Up in You' first."

Other versions
Jamaican reggae singer Dennis Brown's take on the song appears on various 1990s dancehall compilation albums. 
Tongan-American Jawaiian trio Kontiki covered it on their 2008 album Free Again.

Track listing
7" vinyl, CD single
 "Second Chance" (Carl, Carlisi, Curtis) - 4:33
 "Comin' Down Tonight" (Carl, Carlisi, Johnson, Van Zant) - 4:25

Chart performance

Weekly charts

Year-end charts

References

1988 songs
1989 singles
1980s ballads
38 Special (band) songs
American soft rock songs
Rock ballads
A&M Records singles
Song recordings produced by Rodney Mills